The Crisp Baronetcy, of Bungay in the County of Suffolk, is a title in the Baronetage of the United Kingdom. It was created on 5 February 1913 for the lawyer and microscopist Sir Frank Crisp.

Crisp baronets, of Bungay (1913)
Sir Frank Crisp, 1st Baronet (1843–1919)
Sir Frank Morris Crisp, 2nd Baronet (1872–1938) unlocked
Sir John Wilson Crisp, 3rd Baronet (1873–1950)
Sir John Peter Crisp, 4th Baronet (1925–2005)
Sir John Charles Crisp, 5th Baronet (born 1955)

The heir presumptive is the current baronet's brother, Michael Peter Crisp (born 1957).

See also
 Crispe Baronets of Hammersmith

Notes

References
Kidd, Charles, Williamson, David (editors). Debrett's Peerage and Baronetage (1990 edition). New York: St Martin's Press, 1990, 

Crisp